Henry W. Livingston House, also known as "The Hill", is a historic home located at Livingston in Columbia County, New York.  It was built in 1803 and is a massive, two-story brick dwelling coated in stucco.  It has a three-bay central block with wings that terminate in octagons.  The central block features curved bays and a two-story portico with four Ionic order columns and cut stone stylobate. There are also one-story curved porches with smaller Ionic columns that connect the octagons of wings to the central block.  It was built by Henry W. Livingston (1768-1810).

It was added to the National Register of Historic Places in 1971.

References

Houses on the National Register of Historic Places in New York (state)
Houses completed in 1803
Houses in Columbia County, New York
National Register of Historic Places in Columbia County, New York